Guaduella is a genus of African plants in the grass family, the only genus in the tribe Guaduelleae. It belongs to the subfamily Puelioideae, one of the early-diverging lineages in the grasses, but used to be included in the bamboos.

Species
 Guaduella densiflora Pilg. - Nigeria, Cabinda, Cameroon, Republic of Congo, Gabon, Equatorial Guinea
 Guaduella dichroa Cope - Cabinda
 Guaduella humilis Clayton - Nigeria, Cameroon
 Guaduella macrostachys (K.Schum.) Pilg. - Ghana, Nigeria, Cameroon, Gabon
 Guaduella marantifolia Franch. - Cameroon, Republic of Congo, Gabon
 Guaduella oblonga Hutch. ex Clayton - Guinea, Sierra Leone, Ivory Coast, Cameroon, Republic of Congo, Gabon, São Tomé, Bioko

References

External links
 

Puelioideae
Poaceae genera
Flora of Africa
Taxa named by Adrien René Franchet